James Macfarlane (2 September 1844 – 24 November 1914) was a Scottish-born Australian politician. Born in Glasgow, he was educated in London at Bruce Coastal School and worked with a shipping firm. He migrated to Australia in 1870, becoming a merchant and shipping agent. In 1901, he was elected to the Australian Senate for Tasmania as a Free Trader. He held the seat until his defeat in 1910.

Macfarlane died in 1914.

References

Free Trade Party members of the Parliament of Australia
Commonwealth Liberal Party members of the Parliament of Australia
Members of the Australian Senate for Tasmania
Members of the Australian Senate
1844 births
1914 deaths
20th-century Australian politicians